Ingraham Glacier is on the south-eastern flank of Mount Rainier, in the U.S. state of Washington. The glacier is named for the Mount Rainier enthusiast Edward Sturgis Ingraham. From the summit ice cap, Ingraham Glacier flows east between Gibraltar Rock,, and Disappointment Cleaver and south of Little Tahoma Peak, which divides it from the much larger Emmons Glacier to the north. Meltwater from the glacier drains into the Cowlitz River.

History
About 35,000 years ago, the Ingraham and Cowlitz glaciers flowed   down from Mount Rainier to near present-day Mossyrock, Washington. More recently, the Cowlitz - Ingraham glaciers advanced slightly from the mid-1970s to mid-1980s, but have been in a general state of retreat since the end of the Little Ice Age around the year 1850.

The worst mountaineering accident in American history occurred on June 21, 1981, when eleven people died in an ice fall on the Ingraham Glacier. None of the bodies were ever recovered.

See also
List of glaciers in the United States

References

Glaciers of Mount Rainier
Glaciers of Washington (state)